Shirpur airstrip is a small airstrip located in Dhule district in the state of Maharashtra, India. It is not open to the public and is owned and operated by the Shirpur Gold Refinery.

Specifications 
The direction of the runway is 09/27. The airstrip is privately owned and operated by the Shirpur Gold Refinery. The runway serves the Tande district in Dhule, Maharashtra.

References 

Airports in Maharashtra
Year of establishment missing
Dhule district